The benthic boundary layer (BBL) is the layer of water directly above the sediment at the bottom of a body of water (river, lake, or sea, etc.). It is generated by the friction of the water moving over the surface of the substrate. The thickness of this zone is determined by many factors, including the Coriolis force.

The zone is of interest to biologist, geologists, sedimentologists, oceanographers, physicists, and engineers, as well as many other scientific disciplines. It is the area of interaction between the two environments and as such is important in many species' reproductive strategies, particularly larvae dispersal. The benthic boundary layer also contains nutrients important in fisheries, a wide array of microscopic life, a variety of suspended materials, and sharp energy gradients. It is also the sink for many anthropogenic substances released into the environment.

Life in the Deep Sea Benthic Boundary Layer 

The benthic boundary layer (BBL) represents a few tens of meters of the water column directly above the sea floor and constitutes an important zone of biological activity in the ocean. It plays a vital role in the cycling of matter, and has been called the “endpoint” for sedimenting material, which fuels high metabolic rates for microbial populations. After passing through the BBL, this degraded material is either returned to the water column or mobilized into the sediment, where it may eventually become immobilized. With growing concern over the ultimate fate of matter in the ocean, knowledge of the complex biological processes in the deep sea BBL (deep-BBL) and how they affect future sedimentation and remineralization rates is valuable.

In the deep sea (1800 m depth or greater), the BBL is noted as having a near homogenous temperature and salinity with periodic fluxes of detrital or particulate organic matter (POM). This POM is strongly linked to seasonal variations in surface productivity and hydrodynamic conditions. Excluding hydrothermal vents, much of the deep sea benthos is allochthonous, and the importance of bacteria for substrate conversion is paramount.

While the supply of POM, or marine snow, is relatively limited and inhibits species abundance, it sustains a complex yet understudied microbial loop that can maintain both meiofaunal and macrofaunal populations. In a study by Will Ritzrau (1996), it was determined that microbial activities were up to a factor of 7.5 higher in the BBL than in adjacent waters. While this study was completed between 100-400m depth, it could have implications for the deep-BBL. Presently, it is known that deep-BBL bacterial populations are able to support protozoan bacterivores like foraminifera and some metazoan zooplankton, which in turn can support larger organisms. Meiofauna and macrofauna found in the deep-BBL include: copepods, annelids, nematodes, bivalves, ostracods, isopods, amphipods, arthropods and gastropods, to name a few. These organisms ultimately play a vital role in the remineralization of matter and aid in breaking down POM that may eventually become permanent sediment.

As the effects of anthropogenic forcing begin taking an even greater toll on marine processes, long-term studies are essential in determining the health and stability of the deep-BBL. Currently, several groups are employing cabled observatories (ALOHA Cabled Observatory, Monterey Accelerated Research System, NEPTUNE, VENUS, and Liquid Jungle Lab (LJL) Panama- PLUTO) to work towards developing these much needed time-series.

References

Sources 
The Benthic Boundary Layer, Transport Processes and Biogeochemistry. Edited by Bernard P. Boudreau and Bo Barker Jørgensen . February 2001, Oxford University Press.

Oceanography
Limnology